Dausara chiangmai is a moth in the family Crambidae. It was described by Yoshiyasu in 1995. It is found in Thailand.

References

Moths described in 1995
Odontiinae